Rush Run may refer to:

Rush Run, Ohio, an unincorporated community in Jefferson County
Rush Run, West Virginia, an unincorporated community in Fayette County
Rush Run (New River), a stream in West Virginia